The 2000–01 Combined Counties Football League season was the 23rd in the history of the Combined Counties Football League, a football competition in England.

League table

The league featured 20 clubs from the previous season, along with one new club:
Southall, relegated from the Isthmian League

External links
 Combined Counties League Official Site

2000-01
2000–01 in English football leagues